A choker is a close-fitting necklace, worn high on the neck.

Choker or Chokers may also refer to:

 Choker (film), a 2005 American film written and directed by Nick Vallelonga
 Choker Campbell (1916–1993), American musician
 "Choker" (song), a song by Twenty One Pilots from Scaled and Icy, 2021
 Choker, a cable end used in logging (see choke setter)
 An engineering measure for traffic calming
 Lengths of cable used in the transport of harvested trees, after cable logging
 Choke artist, or choker, individuals/teams that cannot cope with pressure in important situations
 Choker (musician), an R&B artist otherwise known as Chris Lloyd
 Choker (video game), a chess variant combining the rules of chess and poker

See also
Choke (disambiguation)